Denny Agus Setiawan (born 11 August 2000) is an Indonesian professional footballer who plays as a winger or attacking midfielder for Liga 1 club Persebaya Surabaya.

Club career

Persebaya Surabaya
He was signed for Persebaya Surabaya and played in Liga 1 in 2022-2023 season. Denny made his league debut on 25 July 2022 in a match against Persita Tangerang at the Gelora Bung Tomo Stadium, Surabaya.

Career statistics

Club

Notes

Honours

Club 
Persebaya Surabaya U20
 Elite Pro Academy U-20: 2019
Persikota Tangerang
 Liga 3 Banten: 2021

References

External links
 Denny Agus at Soccerway
 Denny Agus at Liga Indonesia

2000 births
Living people
Sportspeople from Surabaya
Sportspeople from East Java
Indonesian footballers
Persikota Tangerang players
Persebaya Surabaya players
Liga 1 (Indonesia) players
Association football midfielders